California Against Slavery (CAS) is a 501(c)(3) organization that launched a California state wide directory of organizations and agencies that provide services to victims and survivors of human trafficking, sex trafficking, and labor trafficking. The organization focuses on the specific goal of creating a Connected and Collaborating California. The directory is meant to aid survivors, service providers and concerned citizens in joining the fight against human trafficking. The CAS website contains a page with Resources that directs the user to Awareness Materials, Trainings, Legislation, Prevention Education, Research, and Legislative Models.

Philosophy
The CAS charter is founded on the philosophies that every person has an inherent dignity which society and laws must uphold and protect; that human trafficking, which is by definition a crime against a person also deprives the victim of basic and fundamental human and civil rights; and that allowing any form of slavery to exist is a detriment to our society and communities; the offense reaches beyond the individual.

History
California Against Slavery (CAS) was founded in 2010 as a 501(c)(4) human rights advocacy organization directed at strengthening California state laws to protect victims of sex trafficking, particularly minors, and to increase law enforcement efforts.  The organization focused on the specific goal to put an initiative on the 2012 California ballot. California voters passed Proposition 35 (the CASE Act), a California Against Slavery citizen initiative with over 81% approval, making it the most popular initiative since Californians began the process in 1914.

Ballot initiatives
CAS seeks to initiate a vote on a ballot question that would (1) make stiffer criminal penalties (2) aid district attorneys in prosecuting human trafficking offenses, (3) increase protection for human trafficking victims, (4) mandate two-hour human trafficking training for law enforcement officers, and (5) increase allocation of certain seized assets and fines to organizations that serve human trafficking victims. CAS was unable to reach the required 600,000 signatures required before the March 31, 2010 deadline for automatic placement on the ballot. The organization is actively seeking to raise awareness and to get an initiative on the ballot in 2012.

Raising awareness
CAS’s efforts have been the subject of numerous news programs and news articles. In addition to media exposure, CAS raises awareness throughout California by hosting awareness events.  The location of the events are popular trafficking hubs such as San Francisco and San Diego and Sacramento, the state capital. The most notable event was hosted on June 28, shortly after the ballot deadline in front of the State Capital in Sacramento which included notable appearance in support of CAS including speakers Senate President pro Tem Darrell Steinberg (D-Sacramento), Jenny Williamson, founder of Courage to Be You, Nola Brantley, executive director of MISSSEY, Randy Harrell, senior pastor of New City Church and performances by musicians: Coalition fight music, Freddy Wachter and Kristie White. This event brought people together to hand deliver petitions to the State Capital in furtherance of the inclusion of CAS's anti-trafficking initiative on the 2012 ballot.

CAS and other anti-slavery organizations
CAS’s goal is set for 2012 with efforts to propose an initiative to California’s 23 million eligible voters.  CAS works alongside other organizations such as Coalition to Abolish Slavery and Trafficking, Courage To Be You, Stop the Traffik, and Standing Against Global Exploitation.

Endorsements
CAS has obtained police endorsements from San Diego Police Officers Association, Southern California Alliance of Law Enforcement, National Latino Peace Officers Association, San Diego Chapter, and Peace Officers Research Association of California.

See also 
Human trafficking in California

References

External links 
Official website
https://web.archive.org/web/20101128032529/http://oaklandlocal.com/article/youth-trafficking-series-index
https://www.youtube.com/watch?v=erQwP69Hhks (KRON Channel 4 San Francisco)
https://www.youtube.com/watch?v=Wa_Wo4hbh50&feature=player_embedded (NBC Bay Area)
http://oaklandnorth.net/2010/03/13/as-more-oakland-youth-join-the-sex-trade-law-enforcement-explores-alternatives-to-incarceration/
https://web.archive.org/web/20110629045029/http://abclocal.go.com/kgo/story?section=news%2Flocal%2Fsan_francisco&id=7212507

Organizations that combat human trafficking
Human trafficking in the United States
History of slavery in California
Non-profit organizations based in California